The "5" Royales was an American rhythm and blues (R&B) vocal group from Winston-Salem, North Carolina, United States, that combined gospel, jump blues and doo-wop, marking an early and influential step in the evolution of rock and roll. Most of their big R&B hits were recorded in 1952 and 1953 and written by the guitarist Lowman "Pete" Pauling. Cover versions of the band's songs hit the Top 40, including "Dedicated to the One I Love" (the Shirelles and  the Mamas & the Papas), "Tell the Truth" (Ray Charles and Ike & Tina Turner), and "Think" (James Brown & The Famous Flames). Brown modeled his first vocal group after the "5" Royales, and both Eric Clapton and Stax guitarist Steve Cropper cited Pauling as a key influence. The Rolling Stones singer Mick Jagger covered "Think" on his 1993 solo album Wandering Spirit.
The "5" Royales were inducted into the Rock and Roll Hall of Fame in 2015.

History
Originally the Royal Sons Quintet, the group began recording for Apollo Records in the early 1950s, changing its name to the Royals after abandoning gospel for secular music. The group initially included Lowman Pauling and his brother Clarence, as founding members.  Clarence Pauling later shortened his name to "Clarence Paul".  He left the group to become involved with Motown as a producer.  Other members included the vocalists Jimmy Moore, Obadiah Carter, and Otto Jeffries, with Johnny Tanner singing lead. Tanner's younger brother, Eugene, later replaced Jeffries. The robust Johnny Tanner sang lead on most of the group's hits, including "Think," but the sweeter-voiced Eugene Tanner stepped to the microphone for the group's best-known song, "Dedicated to the One I Love." "Baby Don't Do It" and "Help Me Somebody" became hits in 1953, and the group soon signed with King Records. In addition to heartfelt odes like "Dedicated to the One I Love," Pauling also wrote comic and risque tunes, including "Monkey Hips and Rice", later the title of a two-CD anthology of the group's music released by Rhino Records in 1994. Pauling used an extra-long strap for his guitar, sometimes playing it down around his knees for comic effect. The group shared stages with all the major R&B artists of the 1950s, including Sam Cooke and Ray Charles, once substituting for the latter's Raelettes at a show in Durham, North Carolina.

According to the Acoustic Music organization, the "first clear evidence of soul music shows up with The "5" Royales, an ex-gospel group that turned to R&B".

Confusion arose when two groups of Royals began touring, the other led by the Detroit R&B star Hank Ballard. According to members of the "5" Royales, the confusion peaked in 1953 when an unscrupulous promoter booked Ballard's group in Winston-Salem, trying to pass the Detroit band off as the hometown group with the same name, much to the chagrin of a local audience. Shortly thereafter, the air cleared when Winston-Salem's Royals became the "5" Royales and Detroit's Royals became The Midnighters. (The "5" was in scare quotes because there were actually six members at the time.) Both groups had hits at King working with Rock and Roll Hall of Fame producer Ralph Bass, becoming good friends and routinely competing in battles of the bands at clubs like the Royal Peacock, in the Sweet Auburn section of Atlanta.

With King, "Think" and "Tears of Joy" became hits for the "5" Royales in 1957. Some of their lesser-known tracks from this period are now critically acclaimed as innovative.  Rock critic Dave Marsh chose the 1958 "5" Royales hit "The Slummer the Slum" as one of the top 1001 singles of all time in his book The Heart of Rock and Soul, crediting Pauling with capturing the first intentional use of guitar feedback on record, years before better-known squawks from The Beatles, The Yardbirds, and The Velvet Underground. In the 1960s, R&B gradually gave way to more polished soul music and the Royales' career waned rapidly. The band still recorded, including for Memphis label Home Of The Blues - which results were later compiled on the posthumous Catch That Teardrop album - as well as Vee-Jay, ABC-Paramount, Smash Records and the Todd label.

The "5" Royales broke up in 1965, though various combinations of musicians toured under the group's name into the 1970s. For a time Pauling continued recording with the pianist and frequent Royales collaborator Royal Abbitt as El Pauling and the Royalton. Pauling's brother, Clarence Paul, a former member of the Royal Sons Quintet, found success as a producer and songwriter at Motown Records in the 1960s.

Post-group 
After years of struggle with alcohol dependency, Lowman Pauling (né Lowman Pete Pauling, Jr.; 1927–1973) ended up working as a night watchman at a Manhattan church and died of an apparent seizure on December 26, 1973. He was buried in Evergreen Cemetery in Winston-Salem, as were his brother Clarence, who lies next to him, and his bandmates Otto Jeffries (1912–1975), who died on August 8, 1975, and Obadiah Carter (né Obadiah Hawthorne Carter; 1925–1994). Health problems forced Eugene Tanner (né Eugene Elijah Tanner; 1936–1994) to take disability benefits in the years before his death on December 29, 1994. His brother Johnny Tanner (né John Louis Tanner; 1924–2005) died of cancer on November 8, 2005. Jimmy Moore (aka Johnny; né James Edward Moore; 1926–2008), the last surviving member of The "5" Royales, died on August 16, 2008, at the Cedar Manor Nursing Home in Ossining, New York, after a long illness.

Legacy 
The "5" Royales were inducted into the North Carolina Music Hall of Fame in 2009. They were nominated unsuccessfully for the Rock and Roll Hall of Fame in 2002 and 2004; they were inducted in 2015 in the category Early Influence.

The legacy and influence of the "5" Royales was profiled on National Public Radio's Weekend Edition Sunday on August 14, 2011, in an interview with the guitarist Steve Cropper. Cropper released the album Dedicated: A Salute to the 5 Royales in 2011.

In May 2015, compilation Soul & Swagger: The Complete "5" Royales 1951-1967 won a Blues Music Award in the Historical category. Other posthumous compilations include Monkey Hips and Rice: The "5" Royales Anthology (1994), The Apollo Sessions (1995), It's Hard But It's Fair: King Hits and Rarities (2005) and The Definitive "5" Royales: Home of the Blues & Beyond (2014).

In 2011 Steve Cropper released an album Dedicated: A Salute to the 5 Royales.

Selected singles discography

References

External links
 45cat discography
 J. Taylor Doggett Collection, Southern Folklife Collection, University of North Carolina at Chapel Hill
 "5" Royales singer John Tanner dies November 8, 2005
 "5" Royales Biography I
 "5" Royales Biography II
 NPR interview with Steve Cropper, Sunday, 08/14/11.

Doo-wop groups
American rhythm and blues musical groups
King Records artists
Vee-Jay Records artists
Smash Records artists
Musical quintets
Musical groups from North Carolina
Apollo Records artists